Healdsburg station is a former and future rail station in Healdsburg, California. It will be served by Sonoma–Marin Area Rail Transit after a further phase of construction.

History
The Northwestern Pacific Railroad began serving Healdsburg in July 1871, and built the station building around 1891.  In 1928, the station was remodeled and a  "waiting room arcade" was constructed nearby. Train service was discontinued in 1958, whereupon the building was boarded up for several years after. It was rebuilt in 2011 by the city with the anticipation of future rail service.

, SMART intends to wait until June 2023 to determine whether it would have sufficient funding to combine the Healdsburg extension with the completion of the Windsor extension. If the full $113 million in additional grants is received, Windsor service would begin in 2025 or 2026, and Healdsburg service by 2027.

References

External links
SMART Stations
Station on Google Maps Street View

Railway stations closed in 1958
Sonoma-Marin Area Rail Transit stations in Sonoma County
Future Sonoma–Marin Area Rail Transit stations
2011 establishments in California
Healdsburg, California
Railway stations in the United States opened in 1871
1871 establishments in California
Former Northwestern Pacific Railroad stations